Big Baldy Mountain is a mountain on Vancouver Island, British Columbia, Canada, located  west of Gold River and  southeast of Mount Bate.

See also
List of mountains of Canada

References

Vancouver Island Ranges
One-thousanders of British Columbia
Nootka Land District